Dr. Jerrol Wayne Littles (born 1939) was the eighth director of the NASA Marshall Space Flight Center located in Huntsville, Alabama. He served as director from February 3, 1996, to January 3, 1998.

Early life
Littles was born in Moultrie, Georgia, in 1939.

Education
Attended Moultrie High School, graduating in 1957.
Graduated from Georgia Tech in 1962 with a BME; Phi Eta Sigma, Pi Tau Sigma, Tau Beta Pi and Briaerean societies.
Mechanical Engineering master's degree from the University of Southern California in 1964.
Doctorate from the University of Texas at Austin, Mechanical Engineering, in 1969.
Harvard University, Boston, MA, six-week Advanced Management Program in 1990.

Early career
Aerospace Engineer, North American Aviation, 1962
Rocketdyne in Canoga Park, California, worked in the propulsion area 1962-1964
Research Engineer, Teledyne Brown Engineering, 1964

NASA career

Prior to his appointment as Center Director, Littles served as NASA Associate Administrator for the Office of Space Flight (1994-1996). Littles began his NASA career in 1967 when he worked as an engineer in Marshall's former Propulsion and Vehicle Engineering Directorate. He worked in various capacities at the Marshall Center, including Science Engineering Director (1988-1989) and Center Deputy Director (1989-1994) before transferring to NASA Headquarters in 1994, as Chief Engineer. Littles was involved in the redesign of the space shuttle booster rockets, blamed for the Challenger disaster in 1986.

During his two years as Center Director, Dr. Littles' administration was responsible for the space lab mission, the space science projects, alternative light-weight launch vehicles, and their engine development. He retired from NASA in 1998.

Littles is a Fellow of the American Institute of Aeronautics and Astronautics.

References

External links 
 NASA biography

1939 births
NASA people
Living people
Georgia Tech alumni
USC Viterbi School of Engineering alumni
Cockrell School of Engineering alumni
Directors of the Marshall Space Flight Center
People from Moultrie, Georgia
Date of birth missing (living people)